The Montenegrin–Ottoman War (1852–1853) broke out after Ottoman retaliation for the Montenegrin secret aid to Herzegovinian rebels.

Background
In 1852, Danilo, returning from the Russian Empire, proclaimed himself Prince of Montenegro and the Hills, thus elevating the status of his polity from a theocracy into a principality. Montenegro remained an Ottoman vassal, until the Ottomans attacked Montenegro after the unraveling of Montenegrin secret aid to Herzegovinian rebels.

History
Omar Pasha and Osman Pasha of Scutari attacked Montenegro in November 1852.

Aftermath and legacy
Battle of Grahovac
Convention of Shkodër

See also
Herzegovina Uprising (1852–1862)
Montenegrin–Ottoman War (1876–1878)

References

Conflicts in 1852
Conflicts in 1853
1852 in the Ottoman Empire
1853 in the Ottoman Empire
19th-century military history of Montenegro
Wars involving the Ottoman Empire
Wars involving Montenegro
Principality of Montenegro